Purgatory Dance Party is the debut album by Polkadot Cadaver released via internet pre-sales on November 17, 2007, with a street date of November 27, 2007. The cover art is a reference to the John Travolta film Saturday Night Fever. Dog Fashion Disco had earlier covered the theme tune to another Travolta film, Grease.

A re-recorded version of the album was released on the Razor To Wrist label in June 2020

Track listing
All songs written by Polkadot Cadaver.

The song "Sole Survivor" is in fact only 4:30 long; the track then contains 5 minutes of silence, and from 9:30 onwards it consists of a looped voice saying the word "Satan".

Personnel
Todd Smith – Vocals, Guitar, Bass, Keyboards, Producer
Jasan Stepp – Guitar, Keyboards, Programmed drums, Cello, Bass, Producer
John Ensminger – Drums

Additional personnel
Matt Rippetoe – Saxophone (track 9)
Drew Lamonde – Producer, Recording
Steve Wright – Mixing, Mastering
John Kolbeck – Cover art
Shane Tuttle – Graphic design, Logo
Dan Edwards – Polkadot Cadaver Logo
James Wright – Publicity
Jeff Cohen – Legal
Adam Mandell – Legal
T.J. Barber – Additional art
Souleh – Additional art

References

External links
Todd Smith discusses each song
Review on blogcritics.org

Polkadot Cadaver albums
2007 debut albums